Echiurophilus is a genus of cyclopoid copepods in the family Echiurophilidae, the sole genus of the family. There are at least two described species in Echiurophilus.

Species
These two species belong to the genus Echiurophilus:
 Echiurophilus fizeae Delamare Deboutteville & Nunes-Ruivo, 1955
 Echiurophilus fizei Delamare Deboutteville & Nunes-Ruivo, 1955

References

Cyclopoida